The Simeon P. Smith House is a historic house at 154 High Street in Portsmouth, New Hampshire. Built in 1810–11, it is a fine example of a Federal-style duplex, built for a local craftsman, and one of a modest number of such houses to survive a devastating fire in 1813. It was listed on the National Register of Historic Places on November 14, 1972.

Description and history
The Simeon P. Smith House is located on The Hill, a cluster of historic properties south of Deer and High streets which was created as part of a road widening project. It is located facing High Street on the cluster's northeastern edge. It is a -story wood-frame building, with a gabled roof and interior chimneys. Its central doorway is framed by pilasters and has a triangular pediment above a four-light transom window. Windows are framed by delicate Federal period moulding. Brick chimneys are set on either side of the roof. The interior includes Federal-style cornices, and a fine carved arch in the central hall. Although many rooms retain original Federal period styling, some were altered by subsequent owners to have simpler Greek Revival elements. A secondary entrance has also been added to one of the sides.

The Federal-style house was built between 1810 and 1811 for Simeon P. Smith, a Portsmouth cooper. As one of the few middle-class dwellings to survive the Portsmouth fire of 1813, the house serves as an example of a tradesman's home in Portsmouth in the early 1800s. The house originally stood on the north side of Deer Street, facing south.

See also
National Register of Historic Places listings in Rockingham County, New Hampshire

References

Houses on the National Register of Historic Places in New Hampshire
Federal architecture in New Hampshire
Houses in Portsmouth, New Hampshire
National Register of Historic Places in Portsmouth, New Hampshire